Salarias obscurus is a species of combtooth blenny found in the western central Pacific ocean.

References

External links
 

obscurus
Taxa named by Hans Bath
Fish described in 1992